Belmont Glass Company, also known as the Belmont Glass Works, was one of Ohio's early glassmaking companies.  It was named after Belmont County, Ohio, where the plant was located.  The firm began operations in 1866 in a riverfront village along the east side of the county, which is known as Bellaire.  At that time, the community had resource advantages that made it an attractive site for glassmaking.  Bellaire's location at the intersection of the Ohio River, the National Road, and two railroads meant it had an excellent transportation infrastructure.  Fuel necessary for the glassmaking process was also readily available, since Belmont County was part of the eastern Ohio coal region.  Bellaire also had a workforce with glassmaking expertise located less than five miles away, since glass had been produced in Wheeling, West Virginia, since the 1820s.

The group of men that organized the Belmont Glass Company included men with glass making experience gained from the Hobbs, Brockunier and Company glass works located in Wheeling, West Virginia.  Their new company made glassware such as chimneys (the glass surrounding the wick in a lantern), lamps, and bar goods.  Originally the products were blown glassware, but later pressed glassware was also produced.  Products with intricate patterns such as zipper were also made, and are valued today by collectors.  The Belmont Glass works ceased operations in 1890.  The economy at that time proved difficult for many manufacturers.  In addition, many glass makers began moving to northwest Ohio in the late 1880s—lured by promises of free land, fuel, and cash.

The Belmont Glass works made a strong contribution to the American glass manufacturing industry, both during its period of operation and after the plant was closed.  The company was Bellaire's first glass works, and the second located in Belmont County.  Bellaire soon attracted more glass manufacturers and became known as Glass City.  Belmont County ranked sixth in the nation as a glass manufacturer by 1880.  Men that gained or sharpened their glass making expertise working at Belmont Glass works continued to grow the American glassmaking industry, even after the Belmont works was closed, as they helped start more glass factories in Ohio and Indiana.

History

Wheeling
The history of Belmont Glass Company began in Wheeling, Virginia, as much of the company's glass-making talent came from that town.  Wheeling was an early glass producing center in the American "west", where glass was first made in the 1820s.  This success, supported by low cost fuel and the Ohio River as a transportation resource, encouraged other firms to make glass in Wheeling.  One of the larger glass works on the south side of town was purchased by the Hobbs family in 1845, and operated under various names.  This firm was still in operation in the 1880s under the name of J. H. Hobbs, Brockunier and Company.

In 1866, a new glass manufacturer called Barnes, Faupel and Company was organized in Bellaire, Ohio.  The group consisted of men mostly from the South Wheeling Hobbs works, including George Barnes and Henry Faupel.  The company incorporated several years later, and was named Belmont Glass Company.  The company's directors were W. G. Barnard, Henry Faupel, Charles Henry Over, Henry Carr, and John Robinson.  John Robinson and Henry Over had worked at the Hobbs plant, as had two brothers that joined the new company, Henry and Jacob Crimmel.

Bellaire
The Bellmont Glass Company began manufacturing in Bellaire, Ohio, and helped the community become a major glass-making center.  The community of Bellaire is located in Belmont County, Ohio, along the Ohio River and not far from Wheeling, West Virginia.  One of Bellaire's "public-spirited citizens", William G. Barnard, helped Belmont County become an industrial center.  In addition to being one of the Belmont Glass Company's original directors, he was also president of Bellaire Nail Works, and later the Wabash, Chester and Western Railroad Company.  Barnard was also Bellaire's leading coal dealer.

Belmont County is located in the Ohio coal belt.  At one time, steamships traveling down the Ohio River knew Bellaire as the last stop for coal until Cincinnati.  In 1866, the town also had railroad service from the Baltimore and Ohio Railroad and the Toledo & Ohio Railroad.  The National Road also ran through Bellaire.  Given the town's transportation resources, fuel resource, and experienced workforce nearby, Bellaire was an excellent location for a glass manufacturing plant.  The Belmont Glass Company was Bellaire's first of many glass plants, and the second in Belmont County.  In 1880, the state of Ohio ranked fourth in the country in glass production, and Belmont County ranked sixth among the nation's counties.  By 1881, the town had 15 glass factories, and was known as "Glass City".  At the beginning of the next decade, the state of Ohio was ranked second in the nation in glass production based on the value of the product.

Operations
Barnes, Faupel and Company began operations as a chimney (the glass that surrounds the wick in a lantern) manufacturer in December 1866.  The company incorporated as Belmont Glass Company about two years later, and Henry Faupel was the company's first president.  Belmont Glass was the first glass works in Bellaire, and the second glass works in Belmont County.  An 1871 directory lists Henry Faupel as president, and William Gorby as treasurer.  George Barnes was a machinist.  Charles Henry Over and John Robinson are listed as glass-blowers.  Jacob Crimmel, who started working at glass factories at the age of 11, is listed as a glass-presser.

In 1872, the plant's capacity was expanded, and its employee count reached 150.  That same year, Charles H. Over, John Robinson, and Henry Faupel patented a seamless chimney mold—an improvement to the current version that left seams on the glass.   

By 1884, Belmont Glass (listed as Belmont Glass Works by the state of Ohio inspectors) employed 225 men, 25 women, and 100 minors.  During the 1880s, the company was producing sophisticated novelty items such as salt shakers with zipper patterns and translucent striped opalescent glass.

Decline
Several issues contributed to the eventual closing of the Belmont Glass Works.  The company lost some talent as early as 1876, when John Robinson, C. H. Over, and William Gorby left to start the Bellaire Goblet Company.  A bigger problem was the discovery of natural gas in northwest Ohio.  In early 1886, a major discovery of natural gas occurred near the small village of Findlay.  Soon communities in the area were enticing glass companies to relocate with promises of free fuel, free land, and cash.  The new glass factories typically needed experienced glass workers to run the factories, and many of them came from Wheeling and Bellaire.  A final blow to the Belmont Glass Works was the U.S. economy, which suffered through three recessions between 1882 and 1891.  These factors affected all glass factories in the region.  The city of Bellaire, which had 17 glass furnaces in 1884, had only have 3 furnaces remaining by 1891.  The Belmont Glass Works closed in 1890, and the plant was torn down.  In 1893, the Novelty Stamping Company began operating in a new building constructed on the site of the former glass works.

Legacy
After the Belmont Glass Company/Works closed in 1890, the plant's legacy lived on—as former employees helped establish other glass factories in the region.  Charles Henry Over left Belmont Glass in 1876 to form the Bellaire Goblet Company—which became nationally known for its tableware products.  Joining him were Judge E. G. Morgan, William Gorby, John Robinson, Melvin Blackburn, and Henry Carr.  C. H. Over, Robinson, and Carr were among the Belmont Glass Company's founders and original board members.  William Gorby had been Belmont's secretary.  Morgan was the new company's president, Gorby the secretary, C. H. Over the manager, and Robinson the plant superintendent.  By 1888, the plant employed about 300 people.  In 1888, the Bellaire Goblet Company moved to Findlay, Ohio.  Henry Over decided not to move to Findlay, and instead founded a new glass works in Muncie, Indiana—the C. H. Over Glass Company.  This glass factory employed about 175 people.

John Robinson, who had been plant superintendent when working at Belmont Glass, was named factory manager (replacing Over) of Bellaire Goblet after the 1888 move to Findlay, Ohio.  In 1891, Bellaire Goblet became part of the U.S. Glass Company conglomerate.  While William Gorby remained with the parent firm for many years, Robinson eventually resigned his position.  In 1893, Robinson started the Robinson Glass Company in Zanesville, Ohio.  Financial assistance was provided by additional investors, including Melvin Blackburn—a partner from the Bellaire Goblet Company.  The company produced tableware, bar goods, and novelties.   

Henry and Jacob Crimmel moved from Bellaire to Fostoria in 1887 to help with the startup of the Fostoria Glass Company.  Crimmel family members owned stock in the new company.  Their “recipes” for various types of glass were used for the company's early batches of the product.  As part owner and plant manager, Henry Crimmel was also involved with the startups of the Novelty Glass Company of Fostoria and the Sneath Glass Company.  Jacob Crimmel remained with the Fostoria Glass Company for many years.  He was one of the founders of the American Flint Glass Workers' Union, and wrote articles published in the union's journal, American Flint.

References

Notes
Notes

Cited works

Glassmaking companies of the United States
Defunct glassmaking companies
Defunct manufacturing companies based in Ohio
Belmont County, Ohio